is a Japanese manga series written and illustrated by Tsukiya. It began serialization in the Comic Ride pixiv website in June 2018, and later transferred to Micro Magazine's Comic Elmo manga service in May 2020. It has been collected in eight tankōbon volumes as of August 2022. An anime television series adaptation by Feel and Gaina aired from July to September 2022.

Characters

An enforcer in the Sakuragi family branch of yakuza, Kirishima is tasked by his boss to watch over his 7 year-old daughter Yaeka. Kirishima has known Yaeka since she was a baby. Unbeknownst to Yaeka, Kirishima was once known as Sakuragi's Demon, a notoriously cold-blooded contract killer. 

A quiet, shy, and gentle 7-year old, she is the daughter of Kazehiko Sakuragi. Her father conscripted Kirishima to be her babysitter as his wife is currently hospitalized. While initially cold and unresponsive, particularly to Kirishima, she begins to warm to him and other members of her family as the series progresses. She has a very honest personality.

A former acquaintence of Kirishima who desires to return him to his persona as "Sakuragi's Demon." Mashiro is a sociopath, often displaying signs of mental instability, especially when inflicting pain or watching others suffer.

Media

Manga
The Yakuza's Guide to Babysitting is written and illustrated by Tsukiya. The series began serialization in the Comic Ride pixiv website on June 5, 2018. In May 2020, it transferred to Micro Magazine's Comic Elmo manga service. The first volume was released on December 24, 2018. The series is licensed in English by Kaiten Books.

Anime
An anime television series adaptation was announced on September 8, 2021. It is produced by Feel and Gaina and directed by Itsuro Kawasaki, with scripts written by Keiichirō Ōchi, character designs by Hiromi Ogata, and music composed by Takurō Iga. The series aired from July 7 to September 22, 2022, on Tokyo MX and other channels. The opening theme song is "Mirai no Hero Tachi e" by Shō Takeyaki, while the ending theme song is "Kaerimichi no Iro" by VTuber Shibuya HAL. Crunchyroll has licensed the series, and have streamed an English dub starting on October 20, 2022.

Episode list

Reception
In 2019, The Yakuza's Guide to Babysitting was nominated for the 5th Next Manga Awards in the digital category and placed 15th out of 50 nominees.

Notes

References

External links
 
 
  
  
 

Anime series based on manga
Comedy anime and manga
Crunchyroll anime
Feel (animation studio)
Japanese webcomics
Seinen manga
Webcomics in print
Yakuza in anime and manga